Stanmer House is a Grade I listed mansion set in Stanmer Park west of the village of Falmer and north-east of the city of Brighton and Hove, East Sussex, England.

The house stands close to Stanmer village and Church, within Stanmer Park. Constructed by the French architect Nicholas Dubois in 1722 in a Palladian style for the Pelham family, it incorporates the remains of an earlier house, and was again altered in 1860.

The house and park were bought by the local authority in 1947. The building was designated as Grade I listed in 1954; the former stables, built c. 1725 but much altered, are Grade II* listed.

Close to the University of Sussex campus, the house was used as a university administration building for some years in the 1960s while the campus was being built in the eastern portion of the park. After undergoing extensive renovation, it reopened in June 2006 and for use as a restaurant and events venue.

In 2009, the Willkommen Collective started a music festival at Stanmer House. The first event featured performances from The Leisure Society, Alessi's Ark, Peggy Sue and more in Stanmer House and grounds. The second festival took place on 12 September 2010 and was named Foxtrot. The lineup included Laura Marling, Anna Calvi, Francois & the Atlas Mountains and Sons of Noel and Adrian. The third annual festival took place in September 2011 and featured Herman Düne, Sam Amidon, This Is The Kit and more.

Alexander Proud took over the lease of Stanmer House in 2016, renaming the House "Proud Stanmer House". This change would be reversed to the traditional "Stanmer House" following Proud's closure of the business.

In January 2020, Proud announced that Stanmer House would close to the public as the company entered liquidation, stating that a rent increase was to blame. However many customers had recently criticised the venue under his company's operation, stating that it was poorly run.

Shortly thereafter, Stanmer House was then bought by large local employer and property owner, KSD Support Services. The new leaseholder, owned by local businessmen Chris Gargan, Peter McDonnell and Mark Ratcliffe, reopened Stanmer House for Easter 2021, firstly as The House Cafe and eventually launching the self-titled Stanmer House in December 2022. 

Planning permission to convert the house into a hotel is in place, but KSD is uncertain if it will proceed with this plan.

Stanmer House is currently used as a dual-purpose building, with restaurant and cafe premises on the ground floor, and a number of local businesses occupying offices on the upper floors.

The head chef at Stanmer House as of December 2022 is the locally-renowned Russell Tisbury, the previous operator of the successful Tisbury's Kitchen group of kitchen franchises.

Stanmer House was the location of a Mr. Bean sketch from the late 1980's in which he runs a Reliant Robin three wheeler off the road on the park drive leading to the house, parks outside the house, and enters to take an examination in trigonometry but only finds the calculus paper in the envelope (for which he has done no revision) only to find that the trigonometry paper is indeed in the envelope. However, he finds out far too late and so is unable to write anything meaningful in the time remaining. 

A later scene sees Mr. Bean (Rowan Atkinson) falling asleep during a sermon at the nearby church (a few tens of metres away) with an indignant and shocked churchgoer, Richard Briars, sat in the pew next to him. Bean ends up dozing off on knees and then head at Briars' feet.

References

External links

Official website
Virtual Tour of the house
Stanmer Preservation Society

Houses completed in 1722
Grade I listed buildings in Brighton and Hove
Grade I listed houses
Country houses in Brighton and Hove
Pelham family
1722 establishments in England